Justice Baldwin may refer to:

Briscoe Baldwin (1789–1852), associate justice of the Virginia Supreme Court of Appeals
Caleb Baldwin (judge) (1824–1876), associate justice of the Iowa Supreme Court
Cynthia Baldwin (fl. 1980s–2010s), associate justice of the Pennsylvania Supreme Court
Henry Baldwin (judge) (1780–1844), associate justice of the Supreme Court of the United States
Joseph G. Baldwin (1815–1864), justice of the Supreme Court of California
Richard C. Baldwin (born 1947), associate justice of the Oregon Supreme Court
Simeon Baldwin (1761–1851), associate justice of the Connecticut Supreme Court of Errors from 1808 to 1818
Simeon Eben Baldwin (1840–1927), associate justice of the Connecticut Supreme Court of Errors from 1893 to 1910

See also
Judge Baldwin (disambiguation)